The Croatian International in badminton is an international open held in Croatia since 1999. The tournament belongs to the EBU Circuit. Croatian National Badminton Championships were established already in 1992. In 2022, the second international tournament in Croatia launched as Croatia Open.

Previous winners

Croatian International

Croatia Open

Performances by nation

Croatian International

Croatia Open

References

Badminton tournaments
Badminton tournaments in Croatia
Sports competitions in Croatia
Recurring sporting events established in 1999
1999 establishments in Croatia